The Supercopa de España de Hockey Patines is an annual Spanish rink hockey tournament played by the winners and runners-up of both OK Liga and Copa del Rey. It's managed by Federación Española de Patinaje.

Until 2012, if a team won both OK Liga and Copa del Rey, its Supercopa opponent was the Copa del Rey runners-up.

Since that year, the tournament changed to a Final Four format.

Winners by year

Unofficial trophy.

Wins by club

See also
OK Liga
Copa del Rey de Hockey Patines

References

External links
FEP Official website

Roller hockey competitions in Spain